Precision: The Measure of All Things is a three-part British television series outlining aspects of the history of measurement. It was originally aired in June 2013 on BBC Four.

Episodes

Episode 1: Time and Distance

Episode 2: Mass and Moles

Episode 3: Heat, Light and Electricity

References

External links
 

2013 British television series debuts
2013 British television series endings
2010s British documentary television series
BBC high definition shows
BBC television documentaries about science
British television miniseries
English-language television shows